Big Red may refer to:

Entertainment
 Big Red (book), a book featuring the crew of the USS Nebraska
 Big Red (film), a 1962 Walt Disney film based on the novel by Jim Kjelgaard
 Big Red (sculpture), a 1974 sculpture in Eugene, Oregon, United States
 The Big Red, a 2012 album by John Williamson
 Big Red, a 2000 album by Hugh Blumenfeld
 Big Red, a 1945 novel by Jim Kjelgaard

Products
 Big Red (drink), a brand of citrus-flavored cream soda
 Big Red (gum), a cinnamon-flavored gum made by Wrigley's
 Big Red (motorcycle), a land speed record streamliner

Sports

Horses
 Secretariat (horse)
 Man o' War
 Phar Lap
 Bonecrusher (horse)

Team mascots 
 Big Red (University of Arkansas), University of Arkansas
 Big Red (Cardinals mascot), Arizona Cardinals
 Big Red (Lamar University), Lamar Cardinals 
 Big Red (Western Kentucky University), Western Kentucky University
 Touchdown (mascot) (aka Big Red Bear), Cornell University 
 Denison University
 Lawrenceville School (New Jersey)
 Plymouth High School
 Sacred Heart University
 Shippensburg University of Pennsylvania
 Steubenville High School (Ohio)
 Wayland Academy, Wisconsin

Players and coaches nicknames 
 Seth McClung
 Andy Reid

Team nicknames 
 Arizona Cardinals of the National Football League
 Cornell Big Red, Cornell University
 Glen Cove High School
 Indiana Hoosiers, at Indiana University
 Nebraska Cornhuskers, at the University of Nebraska
 Oklahoma Sooners, at the University of Oklahoma
 Phillips Exeter Academy

Other uses
 Big Red (Chicago building) or CNA Center
 Big red or Tiburonia granrojo, a species of jellyfish
 Gyromitra caroliniana or big red, a species of mushroom 
 Holland Harbor Light or Big Red, the lighthouse at the entrance of a channel connecting Lake Michigan with Lake Macatawa
 Big Red or Nappanerica, a sand dune in the Simpson Desert, Australia
 Big Red, a set of subway cars on Boston's Red Line
 Big Red, a nickname for seven in the casino game of craps
 Big Red, a former professional wrestler with the Continental Wrestling Association

See also
 Great Red Spot